Geoff Dyson (16 March 1923 - April 1989) was an English professional footballer who played as an inside left.

Career
Born Linthwaite, Dyson played for Huddersfield Town, Bradford City and Accrington Stanley.

For Bradford City he made 1 appearance in the Football League.

For Accrington Stanley he made 20 appearances in the Football League, scoring 1 goal.

Sources

References

1923 births
1989 deaths
English footballers
Huddersfield Town A.F.C. players
Bradford City A.F.C. players
Accrington Stanley F.C. (1891) players
English Football League players
Association football inside forwards